The Henry C. Trost House is a historic house in El Paso, Texas. It was built in 1908-1909 for architect Henry C. Trost of Trost & Trost, who designed it. Trost lived here with his siblings: two brothers and a sister. It was purchased by the Grossbeck in 1948, and it was later acquired by Robert McGregor, who teaches at El Paso Community College. The house has been listed on the National Register of Historic Places since July 12, 1976.

References

Buildings and structures in El Paso, Texas
Houses completed in 1908
National Register of Historic Places in El Paso County, Texas
Prairie School architecture
Trost & Trost buildings